Demain Président, is a French political television programme hosted by Anne-Claire Coudray and Gilles Bouleau aired daily on TF1 from 10 to 20 April 2017 at 20:20 CEST. The 20-minute programme, aired during the official campaign of the 2017 French presidential election, seeks to introduce and interrogate the projects presented by the 11 candidates of the presidential election. The broadcast is split into three sections: a portrait on the candidate by Christophe Jakubyszyn, France in 2022, and an opportunity to respond to one or two direct questions from the French people. In general, it shares numerous similarities with L'Entretien politique on France 2.

List of episodes

References

External links 
  

2017 French presidential election
French television news shows